Albert Spahiu (born August 3, 1990) is a Kosovan-Swiss footballer who  plays as a striker for FC Naters.

External links

1990 births
Living people
Swiss men's footballers
Sportspeople from Pristina
Kosovan emigrants to Switzerland
1. FC Lokomotive Leipzig players
BSC Young Boys players
1. FSV Mainz 05 II players
Association football forwards